NSEC may refer to:

National Standard Examination in Chemistry
Netaji Subhash Engineering College
North Shore Events Centre
 The North Seas Energy Cooperation
 Next SECure record of the Domain Name System